This article details the fixtures and results of the Cambodia national football team.

Results & Fixtures

2023

2022

2021

2019

2018

2017

2016

2015

2014

2013

2012

2011

2010

2009

2008

Notes

References

Results
2008 in Cambodian football
2009 in Cambodian football
2010 in Cambodian football
2011 in Cambodian football
2012 in Cambodian football
2013 in Cambodian football
2014 in Cambodian football
2015 in Cambodian football